South of Hell is a 2015 American supernatural horror drama television series starring Mena Suvari. The series was ordered by WE tv with a straight eight episode pick up, with seven episodes airing back-to-back on November 27, 2015, and an eighth episode available only through iTunes.

Premise 
In Charleston, South Carolina, Maria and David Abascal are demon hunters for hire. In Maria's body resides a demon called Abigail, who feeds off the evil that Maria exorcises from others. As Maria does her job of vanquishing evil, she must find a way to exorcise Abigail out of her body. But getting rid of Abigail is not an easy task, as she finds it immensely appealing to reside deep within a conflicted soul such as Maria's.

Cast 
Sources:

Mena Suvari as Maria Abascal, a demon-hunter-for-hire
Zachary Booth as David Abascal, Maria's brother
Bill Irwin as Enos Abascal, Maria and David's father and cult leader
Drew Moerlein as Dusty, Maria's ex-military neighbor and local handyman
Lamman Rucker as Rev. Elijah Bledsoe, a priest
Paulina Singer as Grace, the Reverend's daughter
Lydia Hearst as Charlotte Roberts
Slate Holmgren as Sweetmouth, the local drug dealer
Lauren Velez as Tetra, a spiritual informant
Annapurna Sriram as Diversi-Tay

Episodes

Production
Ti West, Rachel Talalay, Jennifer Lynch and Jeremiah Chechik have been tapped to direct individual episodes.

Broadcast
South Of Hell has been sold for broadcast in several countries worldwide, including the UK. Where currently all eight episodes can be streamed via the NOW TV service on Pick.

References

External links

2010s American drama television series
2015 American television series debuts
2010s American horror television series
2010s American mystery television series
2010s American supernatural television series
American thriller television series
Demons in television
English-language television shows
Television shows about exorcism
Horror drama television series
Serial drama television series
Television shows about spirit possession